Sarie is a South African women's magazine, written in Afrikaans.  It is published by Media24, and is their oldest publication for women, first published in 1949 under the title Sarie Marais. 

Based in Cape Town, it is the most popular publication of its type in South Africa. The magazine is published on a monthly basis.

The magazine seeks to "inspire" its readers (its motto is my inspirasie, "my inspiration") in their lifestyle by informing them about the latest fashion, beauty tips, recipes, health and other subjects relating to its readers.

The editor of Sarie is Michelle van Breda. South African writer, singer and TV personality Nataniël has been writing the Kaalkop column of the magazine since 2002. In 2013 both the magazine and  Michelle van Breda won the MPASA PICA Awards.

References

External links
Official site (in Afrikaans)
Sarie Magazine YouTube Channel

1949 establishments in South Africa
Afrikaans-language magazines
Afrikaner culture in Cape Town
Magazines established in 1949
Mass media in Cape Town
Sarie
Monthly magazines published in South Africa
Sarie